The 2005–06 Israeli Noar Leumit League was the 12th season since its introduction in 1994 as the top-tier football in Israel for teenagers between the ages 18–20.

Hapoel Haifa won the title, whilst Hapoel Kfar Saba and Hapoel Jerusaelm were relegated.

Final table

External links
Noar Premier League 05-06 One.co.il 

Israeli Noar Premier League seasons
Youth